Panamerican Beverage Panamco merged with Coca-Cola FEMSA effective May 6, 2003.  

Prior to the merger, Panamco was 25% owned by The Coca-Cola Company.

Criticism

Panamco has been criticized for its relationship with unions. In Colombia, it has been alleged that the bottling company hired paramilitary mercenaries to assassinate union leaders.  These charges have resulted in several court cases and boycott actions against The Coca-Cola Company.

External links 
 http://news.bbc.co.uk/1/hi/business/2909141.stm
 https://www.sec.gov/Archives/edgar/data/21344/000104746905005411/a2151637z10-k.htm

Coca-Cola bottlers
Drink companies of Colombia